Robert Thom may refer to:

 Robert Thom (engineer) (1774–1847), Scottish civil engineer
 Robert Thom (priest), Scottish clergyman, Dean of Brechin
 Robert Thom (illustrator) (1915–1979), American illustrator known for his portrayal of historical scenes
 Robert Thom (translator) (1807–1846), English–Chinese translator based in Canton, China
 Robert Absalom Thom (1873–1955), Scottish engineer
 Robert Thom (writer) (1929–1979), American author